Tanker may refer to:

Transportation 
 Tanker, a tank crewman (US)
 Tanker (ship), a ship designed to carry bulk liquids
 Chemical tanker, a type of tanker designed to transport chemicals in bulk
 Oil tanker, also known as a petroleum tanker
 LNG carrier, a ship designed for transporting liquefied natural gas
 Tank car, a railroad freight car designed for carrying bulk liquids
 Tank truck, a heavy road vehicle designed for carrying bulk liquids
 Fire tanker, a firefighting vehicle used to carry large amounts of water to a fire
 Air tanker, an aircraft used in Aerial firefighting
 Tanker (aircraft), an aircraft designed for in-flight refueling
 Tanker 910, a specific aircraft used to drop water or retardant on fires in California
 Tanker Pacific, a Singapore-based shipping company

Other 
 André Tanker (1941–2003), Trinidadian musician and composer
 Tanker (album), a 1988 album by Bailter Space
 Tanker boot, a laceless military boot
 Tanker, titular hippopotamus character of the Tinker and Tanker book series
 Tankers (film), a 2018 Russian war film
 Tanker Brewery, an Estonian brewery

See also